Kgakala is a black township of Leeudoringstad in North West Province of South Africa.

References

Townships in North West (South African province)
Populated places in the Maquassi Hills Local Municipality